This article lists all power stations in Tajikistan.

Thermal

Hydroelectric 

Tajikistan
Power stations in Tajikistan
Power stations